This is a list of fauna observed in the U.S. state of Washington.

Animals

Birds

American robin (Turdus migratorius)
Chestnut-backed chickadee (Poecile rufescens)
Spotted towhee (Pipilo maculatus)
Steller's jay (Cyanocitta stelleri)
Dark-eyed junco (Junco hyemalis)
Bald eagle (Haliaeetus leucocephalus)

Fish

Crescent trout (Oncorhynchus clarki crescenti)
Beardslee trout (Oncorhynchus mykiss irideus var. beardsleei)
Pink (Humpback) salmon (Oncorhynchus gorbuscha)
Coho (Silver) salmon (Oncorhynchus kisutch)
Chinook (King) salmon (Oncorhynchus tshawytscha)
Sockeye salmon (Oncorhynchus nerka)
Coastal cutthroat trout (Oncorhynchus clarki clarki)
 Westslope cutthroat trout (Oncorhynchus clarki lewisi)
Rainbow trout (Oncorhynchus mykiss)
Dolly Varden trout (Salvelinus malma)
 Bull trout (Salvelinus confluentus)

Mammals

Roosevelt elk (Cervus canadensis roosevelti)
Shrew-mole (Neurotrichus gibbsii)
American pika (Ochotona princeps)
Snowshoe hare (Lepus americanus)
Mountain beaver (Aplodontia rufa)
Olympic marmot (Marmota olympus)
Grizzly bear (Ursus arctos horribilis)
Pygmy rabbit (Brachylagus idahoensis) reintroduced
Black bear (Ursus americanus)

Reptiles

Amphibians

See also

 List of flora of Washington (state)